This is a list of listed buildings in the Civil Parish of Castle Douglas in the historical county of Kirkcudbrightshire in Dumfries and Galloway,  Scotland.

List 

|}

Key

Notes

References
 All entries, addresses and coordinates are based on data from Historic Scotland. This data falls under the Open Government Licence

Castle Douglas
Listed